Consultative Council may refer to:

 Consultative Council (Bahrain), the semi-elected upper house of the legislative  body of Bahrain
 Consultative Council (Poland), a council created by All-Poland Women's Strike in the context of the Polish protests that started in October 2020